Palkinsky (masculine), Palkinskaya (feminine), or Palkinskoye (neuter) is the name of several rural localities in Russia:
Palkinskaya, Arkhangelsk Oblast, a village in Argunovsky Selsoviet of Velsky District of Arkhangelsk Oblast
Palkinskaya, Kharovsky District, Vologda Oblast, a village in Razinsky Selsoviet of Kharovsky District of Vologda Oblast
Palkinskaya, Tarnogsky District, Vologda Oblast, a village in Verkhovsky Selsoviet of Tarnogsky District of Vologda Oblast